The Peary Land Group is a geologic group in Greenland. It preserves fossils dating back to the Silurian period.

Formations
The following formations are included in the Peary Land Group:
Adams Bjerg Formation
Cape Schuchert Formation
Pentamerus Bjerge Formation
Lafayette Bugt Formation
Hauge Bjerge Formation
Lauge Koch Land Formation
Wulff Land Formation
Merqujoq Formation
Nordkronen Formation
Nyeboe Land Formation
Chester Bjerg Formation
Sydgletscher Formation

See also

 List of fossiliferous stratigraphic units in Greenland
Pentamerus Bjerge

References

Geologic groups of Europe
Geologic groups of North America
Geologic formations of Greenland
Silurian Greenland